Sankhupushpam is a 1977 Indian Malayalam-language film, directed by Baby and produced by Dhanya Enterprises. The film stars M. G. Soman, Vidhubala, Sukumaran, Sukumari, KPAC Lalitha, Jose Prakash and Prema. The film has musical score by M. K. Arjunan.

Plot

Cast 

KPAC Lalitha as Amina
Jose Prakash as Dr. Jose
Prema as Madhaviyamma
Nilambur Balan as Balan
Sukumaran as Venu
Baby Sumathi as Mini
Bahadoor as Mammad
MG Soman as Gopi
Philomina as Naaniyamma
Vidhubala as Devi
Nellikode Bhaskaran as Bheeran
Kunchan as Govindan
Kuthiravattom Pappu as Rajesh

Soundtrack 
The music was composed by M. K. Arjunan and the lyrics were written by Sreekumaran Thampi and Sreedharanunni.

References

External links 
 

1970s Malayalam-language films
1977 films
Films directed by Baby (director)